The 2018–19 Cleveland State Vikings men's basketball team represented Cleveland State University in the 2018–19 NCAA Division I men's basketball season. They were coached by second-year head coach Dennis Felton. The Vikings played their home games at the Wolstein Center as members of the Horizon League. They finished the season 10–21, 5–13 in Horizon League play to finish in eighth place. They failed to qualify for the Horizon League tournament.

On July 12, 2019, head coach Dennis Felton was fired. He finished at Cleveland State with a record of 22–44.

Previous season
The Vikings finished the 2017–18 season 12–23, 6–12 in Horizon League play to finish in a tie for eighth place. As the No. 8 seed at the Horizon League tournament, they defeated Youngstown State and upset No. 1 seed Northern Kentucky and No. 4 seed Oakland to advance to the championship game where they lost to Wright State.

Roster

Schedule and results

|-
!colspan=9 style=| Exhibition

|-
!colspan=9 style=| Non-Conference regular season

|-
!colspan=9 style=| Horizon League regular season

References

2018–19 Horizon League men's basketball season
2017-18
2018 in sports in Ohio
2019 in sports in Ohio